Oliver V. "Spout" Austin Sr. (September 25, 1890 – May 22, 1960) was an American football, basketball, and baseball coach. He served as the head football coach at the Mississippi Normal College—now known as the University of Southern Mississippi—in Hattiesburg, Mississippi from 1921 to 1923, compiling a record of 8–13. Austin was also the head basketball coach at Mississippi Normal from 1921 to 19283, tallying a mark of 15–6, and the school's head baseball from 1920 to 1924, amassing a record of 33–15–3.

Head coaching record

Football

References

External links
 

1890 births
1960 deaths
Ole Miss Rebels baseball players
Ole Miss Rebels men's basketball players
Southern Miss Golden Eagles and Lady Eagles athletic directors
Southern Miss Golden Eagles baseball coaches
Southern Miss Golden Eagles basketball coaches
Southern Miss Golden Eagles football coaches
American men's basketball players